Vasco Martins de Sousa Chichorro (1320s-1387) was Lord of Mortágua, and Chancellor mor under King Peter I of Portugal.

Biography 

His parents were Martim Afonso Chichorro II and Aldonça Anes de Briteiros. Vasco Martins was married several times, one of his wives was Inês Dias Manuel, granddaughter of Manuel of Castile and descendant of Ferdinand III of Castile and Elisabeth of Swabia.

References

External links 
ler.letras.up.pt

1320s births
1387 deaths
14th-century Portuguese people
Portuguese nobility
Portuguese Roman Catholics